Nine Forty-Five is a 1934 British crime film directed by George King and starring Binnie Barnes, Donald Calthrop and Violet Farebrother. It was made at Teddington Studios by the British subsidiary of Warner Brothers. A quota quickie, it is based on a play by Sewell Collins.

Cast
 Binnie Barnes as Ruth Jordan  
 Donald Calthrop as Dr. Venables  
 Violet Farebrother as Mrs. Randall  
 Malcolm Tod as James Everett  
 James Finlayson as P.C. Doyle  
 George Merritt as Inspector Dickson  
 Ellis Irving as Turner  
 Cecil Parker as Robert Clayton  
 Janice Adair as Molly Clayton  
 Margaret Yarde as Margaret Clancy  
 René Ray as Mary Doane

References

Bibliography
 Low, Rachael. Filmmaking in 1930s Britain. George Allen & Unwin, 1985.
 Wood, Linda. British Films, 1927-1939. British Film Institute, 1986.

External links

1934 films
British crime drama films
1934 crime drama films
Films shot at Teddington Studios
Quota quickies
Films directed by George King
Warner Bros. films
Films set in England
British black-and-white films
1930s English-language films
1930s British films